Design Forum Finland is the promotion organization of Finnish design. It is maintained by the Finnish Society of Crafts and Design, which was founded in 1875. The aim of Design Forum Finland is to promote Finnish design both nationally and internationally and to encourage business life to utilize the opportunities of design. Among other things Design Forum Finland awards prizes, reports about current issues in the design field of Finland and organizes competitions and exhibitions.

Prizes and competitions
 Kaj Franck Design Prize
 Fennia Prize - Good design grows global competition 
 The Young Designer of the Year Prize
 Estlander Prize

See also
 Scandinavian design

References

External links
 ICSID
 Network for Cultural Export
 "Souvenirs of Helsinki - variations on a theme of reindeer" by Helsingin Sanomat newspaper

Design institutions
Trade associations based in Finland